Plectrohyla pokomchi is a species of frogs in the family Hylidae. Its specific name refers to the Poqomchi' people, a group of Indian people from the Guatemalan highlands. Common name Rio Sananja spikethumb frog has been coined for it.

Description
The body is robust, with the head slightly wider than the body. The supra-tympanic fold is pronounced; the tympanum is barely evident. The fingers are without webbing whereas the toes are about three-quarters webbed. The skin of the dorsum is shagreened and bears small, round tubercles, more prominently so on the posterior part of the body and the thighs. The coloration is bright green, with darker green or gray tubercles. The flanks and posterior surfaces of thighs are mottled with gray or brown. The venter is dull white, suffused heavily with pale gray. The webbing on the feet red or reddish purple. The iris is bronze with black reticulations.

The tail is muscular with relatively narrow fins.

Habitat and conservation
Plectrohyla pokomchi live in cloud forests, generally near cascading mountain streams. The tadpoles develop in the streams.

The species is uncommon. There is evidence that it has dramatically declined at some sites, and perhaps been extirpated. This may have been caused by chytridiomycosis. Also habitat loss is a major threat. The species is considered " endangered".

References 

pokomchi
Endemic fauna of Guatemala
Amphibians of Guatemala
Amphibians described in 1984
Taxa named by Jonathan A. Campbell
Taxa named by William Edward Duellman
Critically endangered fauna of North America
Taxonomy articles created by Polbot